Arthur F. Marsh was an American politician from the state of Michigan.  Marsh was from Allegan and was Chairman of the Michigan Republican Party from 1898 to 1900.

References
The Political Graveyard

Year of birth missing
Year of death missing
People from Allegan, Michigan
Michigan Republicans